Lume Books is an independent publishing company based in London. Founded in 2018 by Matthew Lynn, Lume publishes many award-winning authors including Marjorie Bowen, A. J. P. Taylor, Paula DiPerna, Nick Thorpe, Wendy Perriam, Ramsey Campbell, Alan Palmer and Robert E. Howard.

History 
Endeavour Media was formed following the closure of Endeavour Press which Lynn had co-founded in 2011. In 2020, Endeavour Media rebranded as Lume Books.

Imprints 
Endeavour published a range of genres under several imprints. Its main list is dedicated to thriller novels, crime fiction, romance novels, historical fiction, biographies and history books. The other imprints included:
Venture, a science-fiction, fantasy and horror imprint.
Frontier, a Westerns imprint.
Compass, which republishes out-of-copyright books.
Verlag, a German-language imprint.
Quill, Endeavour's full-scale print arm.

In early 2019, the publisher launched an audiobook imprint called Endeavour Waves. A month later it announced the launch of Endeavour Keys, an imprint dedicated to biographies of music icons.

References

External links 
 Official website

Publishing companies based in London
British companies established in 2018
Publishing companies established in 2018